Narakeh or Narkeh may refer to:
 Bagh Mahalleh-ye Narakeh
 Bala Mahalleh-ye Narakeh
 Pain Mahalleh-ye Narakeh
 Tazehabad-e Narakeh